Rasmus Schüller (born 18 June 1991) is a Finnish footballer who plays as a central midfielder for Djurgårdens IF and the Finland national team.

Club career

Early career
Schüller began his career at FC Kasiysi, a club based in his hometown Espoo. Later he moved on to rivals HooGee.

FC Honka
Schüller made his debut in an FC Honka jersey during the 2008 Finnish League Cup. He played in his first Premier Division match in August 2008 against RoPS. In December 2008, Schüller signed a contract with Honka that would have kept him in Espoo until the end of the 2011 season.

Schüller scored his first league goal for FC Honka in June 2009, less than a week after his 18th birthday, when his team came out victorious from a match against Kuopion Palloseura. Schüller scored on his debut in European club competitions, netting his team's second goal of the game when FC Honka beat Welsh side Bangor City FC in the Europa League on 16 July 2009. In August 2009, Schüller scored his second league goal for FC Honka and was named man of the match when he helped his team to a 3–1 victory over Tampere United.

On 22 September 2009, it was announced that Schüller had put pen to paper for a new deal until the end of the 2012 season.

HJK
In February 2012, HJK announced the signing of Schüller from FC Honka, along with teammate Demba Savage, for an undisclosed fee. Qualified for the Europa League group stages 2014 with HJK with a 5-4 aggregate victory over SK Rapid Wien.

BK Häcken
On 7 October 2015, Schüller agreed to transfer to Swedish Allsvenskan side BK Häcken for the 2016 season. Schüller was then joined at BK Häcken by HJK teammate Demba Savage on 28 October 2015.

Minnesota United

2017 season
On 24 January 2017, Schüller signed with Minnesota United.

Schüller was released by Minnesota at the end of their 2019 season.

Return to HJK (loan)
On 9 August 2017, Schüller rejoined HJK until the end of the season.

International career
Schüller was a member of the Finnish U21 national team.

Schüller was called up for the UEFA Euro 2020 pre-tournament friendly match against Sweden on 29 May 2021.

Personal life
Schüller is a Swedish-speaking Finn with German ancestry.

Schüller has studied law at University of Helsinki.

Career statistics

Honours

HJK
 Veikkausliiga: 2012, 2013, 2014, 2017, 2020
 Finnish Cup: 2014, 2017, 2020
 Finnish League Cup: 2015

BK Häcken
Svenska Cupen: 2015–16

References

External links
Schüller's profile on FC Honka's website 
Schüller's profile on Veikkausliiga's website 

1991 births
Living people
Finnish footballers
Finnish expatriate footballers
Finland international footballers
Finland youth international footballers
Finland under-21 international footballers
FC Honka players
Helsingin Jalkapalloklubi players
BK Häcken players
Minnesota United FC players
Veikkausliiga players
Allsvenskan players
Major League Soccer players
UEFA Euro 2020 players
Expatriate footballers in Sweden
Expatriate soccer players in the United States
Finnish expatriate sportspeople in Sweden
Association football forwards
Finnish people of German descent
Swedish-speaking Finns
Footballers from Espoo